The Oklahoma State–Tulsa football rivalry is a college football rivalry game between Oklahoma State and Tulsa. The two teams first played each other in 1914, and the rivalry has been played on and off for a total of 75 games as of 2021.

Series history
From 1935 to 1956, the two teams both competed in the Missouri Valley Conference. In those 22 seasons, the conference champion would be won by either Oklahoma State or Tulsa 16 times.  They played each other annually from 1926 to 1965. Then played again regularly from 1981 to 2000. The two universities are approximately 70 miles apart via the Cimarron Turnpike.

In 1992, the Tulsa World reported that former Tulsa teammates Dave Rader and Denver Johnson were now coaching on opposite sides: Rader as Tulsa head coach and Johnson as Oklahoma State offensive line coach.

The Bank of Oklahoma began a sponsorship deal in 2017 with Oklahoma State and Tulsa to name the series the Bank of Oklahoma Turnpike Classic.

The next scheduled game between Oklahoma State and Tulsa is scheduled for September 14, 2024, in Stillwater, as part of annual home-and-home series that extends through 2031 with a hiatus in 2022 and 2023.

Quotes on the series
"The University of Tulsa and Oklahoma State have a colorful history of compelling football games," wrote Bill Haisten for the Tulsa World in 2010. Bill Connors wrote 16 years earlier for the Tulsa World: "Tulsa and Oklahoma State never played each other in football when the game seemed insignificant to the participants."

Oklahoma State head coach Jimmy Johnson said in 1982: "OU and OSU, that's a rivalry, but not OSU and Tulsa." In contrast, Tulsa head coach John Cooper said about the Oklahoma State–Tulsa series: "It's a natural rivalry, and I don't think you can underestimate the importance of that."

In 2008, The Oklahoman sportswriter Berry Tramel wrote that this series "should be played regularly" because Tulsa had improved over the decade. However, Tramel changed his opinion in 2017: "OSU-Tulsa has faded away. . . . Conference realignment and economic realities have made it more difficult for age-old rivals to schedule, especially when they end up on different competitive planes."

Notable games

1945
Oklahoma A&M 12 – Tulsa 6

Oklahoma A&M entered week 6 undefeated (5–0) ranked No. 11 and hosted a Tulsa team who had dropped to No. 19 after their first loss to Indiana the previous week. This is the only contest between the two schools with both teams ranked in the AP Poll. The Cowboys defeated the Golden Hurricane en route to an undefeated (9–0) season.

1995
Tulsa 24 – Oklahoma State 23

Tulsa was trailing by 20 points in the fourth quarter, then scored three touchdowns in the final 5:41 to win 24–23 in what was then still called Skelly Stadium.

2011
Oklahoma State 59 – Tulsa 33

In week 3, Tulsa took on Oklahoma State in a home game that memorably lasted until 3:35 AM after inclement weather delayed the kickoff past midnight. The Golden Hurricane scored a field goal on their first drive to take an early lead, but were unable to contain the Cowboys' potent offense and quickly fell behind for good. The team was further hindered by the loss of G.J. Kinne near the end of the first quarter, forcing them to rely heavily on the run for the remainder of the game.

Game results

See also  
 List of NCAA college football rivalry games

References

College football rivalries in the United States
Oklahoma State Cowboys football
Tulsa Golden Hurricane football
1914 establishments in Oklahoma